Carlos J. Miguens Bemberg (born 16 February 1949), is an Argentine businessman and descendant of the wealthy Bemberg family of immigrants to Argentina.

Overview
His parents were the architect Carlos Miguens and the film director María Luisa Bemberg. Carlos Miguens Bemberg attended school at Colegio San Jorge, Colegio Cardenal Newman, and Universidad del Salvador, where he completed four years of studies in economics. He was a Director of the Luxembourg-based holding company Quilmes Industrial S.A. (Quinsa) from 1989 until his resignation on May 17, 2006. His professional experience includes serving as President of Cerveza Quilmes, one of Argentina's largest brewing companies which was founded by Otto Bemberg in 1888 in Quilmes, Buenos Aires Province. He has also been President of M.B.P. International, and is currently President of M.B. Holdings (Miguens Bemberg Holdings) and Agropecuaria Cantomi. He is also extremely active in Argentina's mining industry, acting as a Director of Patagonia Gold S.A. since its inception, and he is a former Director of Minera El Desquite S.A.

Notes

See also
Latin America's Most Important Businessmen

External links
Secret Meeting of Latin American Billionaires
Patagonia Gold 2005

1949 births
Argentine businesspeople
Argentine people of German descent
Living people
Place of birth missing (living people)
People educated at Colegio Cardenal Newman